Remy Blumenfeld (born 1965) is a British television producer and format creator, who co-founded the production company Brighter Pictures which he sold to Endemol in 2004. He is the TV format creator of There's Something About Miriam, Gay, Straight or Taken?, Wudja Cudja and Undercover Lovers. According to The Guardian, Blumenfeld has created and produced more than 30 original television series, which also include BBC1's Tabloid Tales with Piers Morgan and My Worst Week, and BBC2's Get a New Life.

Life and career
Blumenfeld was born in Paris, the son of American parents. His father Yorick Blumenfeld is a writer. His mother Helaine Blumenfeld is a sculptor. His grandfather was the fashion photographer, Erwin Blumenfeld, about whom he made a 2013 documentary for BBC4 – The Man Who Shot Beautiful Women. Blumenfeld spent his early years in New York and Vienna before his family moved to the UK and settled in Cambridgeshire. He attended Bedales School and in the summers acted with the National Youth Theatre. After leaving school he worked in the New York City area for several years as a reporter for WPIX and WWOR-TV. He recalls knowing that he was gay from the age of eight.

On his return to the UK Blumenfeld founded the production company Brighter Pictures with Gavin Hay in 1991. It was bought by Endemol in 2001, but he remained at Endemol for several years as creative director for Brighter Pictures. During his time at Brighter Pictures he also produced the BBC4 documentary The Other Francis Bacon.

Later, Blumenfeld joined ITV Studios where he worked until 2010 as director of formats. At ITV he exported TV shows such as Come Dine with Me, I'm a Celebrity...Get Me Out of Here! and Four Weddings internationally and launched production divisions in France and Spain.

In 2016, Blumenfeld co-founded The Hot House, a TV production incubator. During his career he has also produced several stage plays, including Eunuchs In My Wardrobe (Edinburgh Fringe, 2011) and Tennessee Williams's Confessional (Southwark Playhouse, 2016).

Blumenfeld was ranked 19th in The Independent on Sundays 2006 Pink List of the most influential gay men and women in the United Kingdom.

References

External links

Q&A: Remy Blumenfeld at The Hollywood Reporter

Living people
British television executives
National Youth Theatre members
British Jews
People educated at Bedales School
1965 births